.asec is the file extension of an Android secure encrypted (ASEC) file. This file extension is specifically associated with Google's Android operating system. It was first introduced with Android 2.2 (code name Froyo) in May 2010.

The purpose of an ASEC format is to prevent existing applications from being modified or corrupted by other programs. Applications moved to an SD card use an ASEC extension. These files can then be found under the .android_secure folder on the SD card. If an application must be moved from memory back to its device’s local storage, the file is decrypted from the ASEC file format to a basic APK (Android Package) file format.

References

Android (operating system)
Computer file formats
Android (operating system) software